Lapeyrère Bay is  long and  wide, and lies north of Gourdon Peninsula, indenting the northeast coast of Anvers Island, in the Palmer Archipelago, Antarctica. Its head is fed by Iliad Glacier.

The bay was roughly charted by the German expedition under Eduard Dallmann, 1873–74. It was recharted by the French Antarctic Expedition, 1903–05, and named by Jean-Baptiste Charcot for Rear Admiral Boué de Lapeyrère of the French Navy.

See also
Gerlache Strait Geology
Anvers Island Geology

References

Bays of the Palmer Archipelago
Geography of Anvers Island